The 10th BET Awards took place at the Shrine Auditorium in Los Angeles, California on June 27, 2010. The awards recognized Americans in music, acting, sports, and other fields of entertainment over the past year. Queen Latifah hosted the event for the first time.

Nominees and winners
Winners are highlighted in boldface

Chris Brown's Michael Jackson tribute
During the Awards, a tribute to Michael Jackson was performed by Chris Brown. After a speech from the singer's brother, Jermaine, the tribute began with Brown dancing Jackson's signature dances behind a lighted sheet. He then sung a piece of "The Way You Make Me Feel" and performed the Egyptian dance sequence of the "Remember the Time" music video. Brown later danced Jackson's moves to "Billie Jean", including his famous moonwalk. 

Finally, Brown was to sing "Man in the Mirror", but during the performance, he began to break down in tears to the point where he could not sing the rest of the song; the audience then helped Brown with the song and Brown was seen with Jermaine on his shoulders walking with him off the stage.

He later returned to the stage when he won the AOL "fandemonium award" and gave a small speech: "I let you all down before, but I won't do it again. I promise you," he said.

References

External links
 Official website

BET Awards
2010 music awards